Ayele Mezgebu (born 6 January 1973) is a retired Ethiopian long-distance runner who specialized in cross-country running.

He is the older brother of Assefa Mezgebu.

International competitions

External links

1973 births
Living people
Ethiopian male long-distance runners
Ethiopian male steeplechase runners
African Games bronze medalists for Ethiopia
African Games medalists in athletics (track and field)
Athletes (track and field) at the 1995 All-Africa Games
20th-century Ethiopian people
21st-century Ethiopian people